AD 33 (XXXIII) was a common year starting on Thursday (link will display the full calendar) of the Julian calendar. At the time, it was known in the Roman world as the Year of the Consulship of Ocella and Sulla (or, less frequently, year 786 Ab urbe condita). The denomination AD 33 for this year has been used since the early medieval period, when the Anno Domini calendar era became the prevalent method in the world for naming years.

Events

By date
April 3 – According to Colin Humphreys's account, Jesus of Nazareth's Last Supper takes place.

By place

Roman Empire 
 Emperor Tiberius founds a credit bank in Rome.
 A financial crisis hits Rome, due to poorly chosen fiscal policies. Land values plummet, and credit is increased.  These actions lead to a lack of money, a crisis of confidence, and much land speculation.  The primary victims are senators, knights and the wealthy.  Many aristocratic families are ruined.

China 
 Although the usurpation of Wang Mang and the Chimei Rebellion are behind him, Emperor Guangwu now faces a new threat to the Han Dynasty: the Rebellion of Gongsun Shu in the Sichuan province. Gongsun's naval forces are unsuccessful against Han General Cen Peng, so Gongsun decides to fortify his position by blockading the entire Yangtze River with a large floating pontoon bridge, complete with floating fortified posts. After Cen Peng is unable to break through, he constructs several "castle ships" with high ramparts and ramming vessels known as "colliding swoopers", which break through Gongsun's lines and allow Cen to quell his rebellion. Gongsun Shu is totally defeated three years later.

Births 
 Gaius Rubellius Plautus, son of Gaius Rubellius Blandus and Julia Livia (granddaughter of Tiberius) (d. AD 62)

Deaths 
 April 3 – Jesus of Nazareth, (possible date of the crucifixion) [born c. 4 BC]) The other possible dates supported by a number of scholars are April 7, AD 30 and April 6, AD 31.
 Agrippina the Elder, daughter of Marcus Vipsanius Agrippa, wife of Germanicus (suicide by starvation; b. c. 14 BC)
 Drusus Caesar, son of Germanicus and Agrippina the Elder, adoptive son of Tiberius (starvation; b. AD 8)
 Gaius Asinius Gallus, widower of Vipsania Agrippina and alleged lover of Agrippina the elder (starvation)
 Lucius Aelius Larnia, Roman consul, governor and praefectus urbi in Rome (natural causes; b. c. 45 BC)
 Marcus Aemilius Lepidus, Roman consul and father-in-law of Drusus Caesar (natural causes; b. c. 30 BC)
 Marcus Cocceius Nerva, Roman jurist (suicide by starvation; b. c. 5 BC)
 Munatia Plancina, wife of Gnaeus Calpurnius Piso (suicide)

References 

0033

als:30er#33